Venkata or Venkat may refer to:

 Venkata (hill) or Venkatadri, one of the seven sacred peaks of Tirumala hill in Andhra Pradesh, India
 Venkateswara ("the Lord of Venkata"), a form of the Hindu god Vishnu

Places in India
 Venkatagiri, Nellore district, Andhra Pradesh
 Venkatapuram, Khammam, a mandal in Khammam district, Telangana
 Venkatapuram, Krishna, a village in Krishna district, Andhra Pradesh
 Venkatapuram, Kurnool, a village in Kurnool district, Andhra Pradesh

People
 Venkata I (died 1542), king of the Vijayanagara Empire, South India
 Venkata II (reign 1585–1614 CE), king of the Vijayanagara Empire, South India
 Venkata III (reign 1632–1642), king of the Vijayanagara Empire, South India
 C. V. Raman (18881970), Indian physicist, 1930 Nobel Prize for Physics
 P. A. Venkatachalam, Indian biomedical engineer
 R. R. Venkat (fl. 2004–2013), Indian film producer
 C. S. Venkatakrishnan, American banker, CEO of Barclays 
 Srinivasaraghavan Venkataraghavan (born 1945), Indian cricketer
 T. N. Venkataramana (born 1958), Indian mathematician
 Suresh Venkatasubramanian, Indian-American computer scientist

See also 
 Venkatesh, given name and family name
 Venkataraghavan (disambiguation)
 Venkataraman (disambiguation)
 Venkata Rao (disambiguation), multiple people

Hindu given names
Sanskrit-language names
Indian given names
Telugu names